Platycorynus cribratellus is a species of leaf beetle. It is distributed in Uganda, Kenya, Ethiopia, southern Sudan, the Central African Republic and the Democratic Republic of the Congo. It was described by Léon Fairmaire in 1885.

References

Eumolpinae
Beetles of the Democratic Republic of the Congo
Taxa named by Léon Fairmaire
Beetles described in 1885